Nada Es Igual (Nothing Is the Same) is the third studio album from Spanish artist Chenoa, recorded in Milan at the summer of 2005 and produced by the prestigious Dado Parisini.

Chenoa's music changed to pop rock for this album. It sold more than 100,000 copies in Spain, and was also a success in many Latin-American countries. The cover art of the album resembles that of Annie Lennox's third studio album Bare.

The first single was "Rutinas" ("Routines"), a pop rock mid-tempo, released in Spain in October 2005 reaching her sixth number 1. The following singles were "Tengo Para Ti" (number 5), and the rock ballad "Donde Estés" only for promotion.

Nada Es Igual is Chenoa's first album without any songs in English, despite some songs have English subtitles.

Track listing
 "Rutinas (Little Miss Hypocrite)" – 4:10
 "Tengo Para Ti" – 3:00
 "Donde Estés..." – 3:33
 "Nada Es Igual (The Sun Is Going Down)" – 4:10
 "Camina (Don't Make Me)" – 3:45
 "Te Encontré" – 4:03
 "Encadenada a Tí" – 3:26
 "Me Enamoro Del Dolor (Even When You're With Me)" – 4:00
 "Ladrón de Corazones" – 3:50
 "Contigo y Sin Tí" – 4:44
 "Sol, Noche y Luna" – 6:01
 "Rutinas" (video clip)
 "Te Encontré" (multimedia track)
 Bonus material

Chart performance

Singles

Nada Es Igual Tour
During 2006, Chenoa tour featured concerts across more than 60 cities in Spain. A live DVD called Contigo Donde Estés, filmed at the Plaza de Toros, Majorca concert, attended by more than 15,000 fans, was released in December 2006.

Award nominations
 Principales Award for Best Spanish Artist of 2006 (Spain, nominated)
 Gardel Award for Best Spanish Pop Album of 2007 (Argentina, nominated)

References

2005 albums
Chenoa albums
Universal Music Spain albums